Heart and Soul is a 2008 novel by the Irish author Maeve Binchy. The plot centers around what Binchy terms "a heart failure clinic" in Dublin and the people involved with it. Several characters from Binchy's previous novels, including Evening Class, Scarlet Feather, Quentins, and Whitethorn Woods, make appearances.

Background
Binchy, who "suffered a health crisis related to a heart condition" in 2002, was inspired to write Heart and Soul by her own experiences and observations in the hospital.

References

External links 
 Plot summary at maevebinchy.com

2008 Irish novels
Novels by Maeve Binchy
Novels set in hospitals
Novels set in Dublin (city)